The Universities and Colleges Basketball League (UCBL) is a collegiate basketball tournament based in the Philippines, which was established in 2016. The inaugural season of the UCBL officially opened on October 8, 2016 with seven competing schools from Metro Manila and nearby provinces competing in the tournament.

Organized by the Universities and Colleges Athletic League, Inc. (UCAL), headed by the league's president Franklin Evidente, UCBL's mission is to give better opportunities for aspiring players as well as showcase their talents in the hard court. In addition, the league will provide better officiating of the games and to give the players and teams the opportunity to be seen on national television.

All games are to be held at the Paco Arena every Mondays and Thursdays, The Live telecast of the games are aired on Smart Sports through livestreaming coverage provided by Smart Communications. 

The group of referees from the Samahang Basketbol ng Pilipinas were tapped to officiate the games.

Current teams
CEU Scorpions – HC: Chico Manabat 
Diliman College Blue Dragons – HC: Rensy Bajar
LPU-Batangas Pirates - HC: Dan Acero
PCU-Dasmarinas Dolphins - HC: Johnny Belandrez 
Olivarez College Sealions – HC: Stephen Mopera
Guang Ming College-Tagaytay - HC: Moriah Gingerich 
University of Batangas Brahmans – HC: Arnold Cantorno

Former Teams
BulSU Gold Gears – HC: Antonino Tayao
CDSL Griffins – HC: Bonifacio Garcia
National College of Business and Arts Wildcats - HC: Jake Codamon
TIP Engineers – HC: Sebastian de Vera
St. Joseph College-Bulacan Taurus - HC: Noel Leguin

See also
UAAP Basketball Championship
NCAA Basketball Championship (Philippines)
National Athletic Association of Schools, Colleges and Universities

References

External links

2016 in Philippine sport
Sports leagues established in 2016
2016 establishments in the Philippines
College basketball competitions in the Philippines